480th may refer to:

480th Fighter Squadron, active United States Air Force unit
480th Intelligence, Surveillance and Reconnaissance Wing (480th ISR Wing) is headquartered at Langley Air Force Base, Va.

See also
480 (number)
480, the year 480 (CDLXXX) of the Julian calendar
480 BC